Rhynchobapta is a genus of moths in the family Geometridae erected by George Hampson in 1895.

Species
Rhynchobapta cervinaria (Moore, 1888) India
Rhynchobapta irrorata Hampson, 1902 southern India
Rhynchobapta eburnivena (Warren, 1896) north-eastern Himalayas, Japan, Borneo, Sumatra, Sulawesi

References

Baptini